Matthieu Bochu (born March 31, 1979 in Arras) is a French professional football player. He is a forward. Currently, he plays in the Championnat National for FC Martigues.

He also played for several years in a number of Italian minor league teams, including Fiorentina (then called Florentia Viola) in their Serie C2 campaign after the original club disbanded in 2002. He claims that the peak of his career was playing for Fiorentina against Juventus in the 2003 Italian Cup quarterfinal.

On 8 January 2010 he arrived in Sofia, Bulgaria, where he was trialed for local champions Levski Sofia. He finally decided to join the FC Martigues team who plays in Championnat de France amateur. The team is at the top of the league and fight to be promoted to Championnat National so they can become a Professional team again.

References

1979 births
Living people
ACF Fiorentina players
Ravenna F.C. players
Vastese Calcio 1902 players
French footballers
French expatriate footballers
Expatriate footballers in Italy
Expatriate footballers in Spain
Association football forwards
Stade Brestois 29 players
FC Istres players
Racing de Ferrol footballers
Louhans-Cuiseaux FC players
FC Martigues players
A.S. Gubbio 1910 players
Serie C players
Ligue 2 players
Championnat National players
Sportspeople from Arras
Footballers from Hauts-de-France
French expatriate sportspeople in Spain
French expatriate sportspeople in Italy